Mullendorf is a town in the commune of Steinsel, in central Luxembourg.  , the town has a population of 1,005.

Steinsel
Towns in Luxembourg